John Frederick "Johnny" Gustafson (8 August 1942 – 12 September 2014) was an English bass guitar player and singer, who had a lengthy recording and live performance career. During his career, he was a member of the bands The Big Three, The Merseybeats, Quatermass, Roxy Music and Ian Gillan Band.

Career
Born in Liverpool to a father of Swedish descent and mother of Irish descent, he is known for his work with 1960s bands The Big Three and The Merseybeats, and for singing on the original recording of Jesus Christ Superstar as Simon Zealotes. He made an appearance on Roger Glover's The Butterfly Ball and the Grasshopper's Feast album track, "Watch Out for the Bat", as a vocalist. He is probably best known for playing bass guitar for several re-incarnations of the Ian Gillan Band and for his earlier participation in the progressive rock band, Quatermass. He also re-formed The Pirates, originally the backing band for Johnny Kidd.

Gustafson performed on three studio albums for Roxy Music during the years of 1973 through 1975. However, he was frequently not with the band on live dates, often being replaced by John Wetton or Sal Maida. His final record with the band, Siren, included their only American top 40 hit single, "Love Is the Drug". Frontman Bryan Ferry later called Gustafson a "wonderful player", adding, "“Love Is the Drug” wouldn’t have been anything without the bass playing. It really bought that track alive."

He was bassist on several tracks for Flamenco guitarist Juan Martin's 1981 concept album, Picasso Portraits (Flamencovision CD FV 03, 1994) namely: Harlequin – 1918, Desire Caught By The Tail – 1943, The Aficionado – 1912 and Girls of Algiers – 1955. Also played on Kevin Ayers' album The Confessions of Dr Dream, 1974.

In 1983 he was in the group Rowdy which included Ray Fenwick and Billy Bremner.

Gustafson is the father of John and Lee from his first marriage, and Alice, Lucy and Joe from his marriage to Anne Gustafson, who he was married to for over 30 years until his death.

Discography

With The Big Three 
 At the Cavern Decca EP (1963)
 Resurrection Polydor (1973)

With The Merseybeats 
The Merseybeats Fontana (1964)
On Stage Fontana EP (1964)
I Think of You Fontana EP (1964)
Wishin' and Hopin''' Fontana EP (1964)The Merseybeats Greatest Hits Look (compilation album) (1977)Beats and Ballads Edsel (compilation) (1982)

With Quatermass  Quatermass  Harvest (1970)

With Bullet / Hard Stuff 
"Hobo" / "Sinister Minister" – Single (1971) Purple Records (as Bullet)Bulletproof  Purple Records (1972)Bolex Dementia Purple Records (1973)The Entrance to Hell – different mix of Bulletproof (2010) (as Bullet)

With Roxy Music  Stranded Island (1973)Country Life Island (1974)Siren Island (1975)Viva! Island (1976)

With Ablution  With Peter Robinson, Jayson Lindh, Jan Schaffer, Malando Gassama, Barry De Souza, Ola Brunkert.Ablution CBS (1974)

With Ian Gillan Band  Child in Time Oyster (1976)Clear Air Turbulence Island (1977)Scarabus Island (1977)Live at the Budokan Virgin (1978)The Rockfield Mixes Angel Air (1997)Live at the Rainbow Angel Air (1978)

With The Pirates Lights Out/I'm into Something Good EP (1986), with Mick Green and Frank FarleyStill Shakin Magnum/Thunderbolt (1988), with Mick Green and Geoff BrittonLive in Japan Thunderbolt (2001), with Mick Green and Les Sampson

As contributorJesus Christ Superstar (1969) On vocals.Joseph And The Amazing Technicolor Dreamcoat (1974) On bass.

With Roger Glover And Guests The Butterfly Ball And The Grasshopper's Feast (1974) John vocals on Watch Out For The Bat.

With Shawn Phillips Furthermore (1974)Rumplestiltskin's Resolve (1976)

With Steve HackettVoyage of the Acolyte(1975) Bass on Star of SiriusWith Bryan Ferry Let's Stick Together (1976) Bass on Re-Make/Re-ModelWith Gordon Giltrap The Peacock Party PVK (1981)Live Electric (1981)

With Joe Jammer  Headway Angel Air (2015), recorded 1974 with Mitch Mitchell on drums

With Ian Paice, Tony Ashton, Jon LordMalice in Wonderland (1977).

Solo albumGoose Grease'' Angel Air (1997)

References

External links
Exclusive interview with John Gustafson, August 2007

Liner notes from re-release of Gustafson's 1975 album "Goose Grease"

1942 births
2014 deaths
English rock singers
English rock bass guitarists
Male bass guitarists
English people of Swedish descent
English people of Irish descent
Roxy Music members
Musicians from Liverpool
Johnny Kidd & the Pirates members
The Big Three (English band) members
Ian Gillan Band members
Quatermass (band) members
Episode Six members
The Merseybeats members